The William Simonds House is a historic house in Winchester, Massachusetts.  The two-story wood-frame house was built in 1877 by William Simonds, and is a good local example of Second Empire styling.  It has the classic mansard roof, and a symmetrical three bay front facade.  On the first floor, projecting bay windows flank the entry; their bracketed roof lines are joined to that of the wide porch that shelters the front entry.  The mansard roof is pierced by dormers with rounded windows.

The house was listed on the National Register of Historic Places in 1989.

See also
National Register of Historic Places listings in Winchester, Massachusetts

References

Houses on the National Register of Historic Places in Winchester, Massachusetts
Houses in Winchester, Massachusetts